SPP or spp may refer to:

Businesses
 Sigmund Pulsometer Pumps, a British engineering company
 Slovenský plynárenský priemysel, a Slovak natural gas company
 Sucker Punch Productions, an American video game developer
 Sumitomo Precision Products, an aerospace and sensor manufacturer
 ShowBiz Pizza Place, a former chain of pizza restaurants

Gaming
 Sucker Punch Productions, an American video game developer
 SuperPoke! Pets, an online game app
 Super Princess Peach, a 2006 video game

Organizations

Government bodies
 Saskatchewan Pension Plan, a government-run pension plan in Canada
 Security and Prosperity Partnership of North America, between Canada, Mexico and the United States
 Protection and Guard Service, Romania

Learned societies
 Paris Psychoanalytic Society, France
 Society for Philosophy and Psychology, North America

Political parties

 Justice and Reconciliation Party (Stranka pravde i pomirenja), a political party in Serbia and Montenegro
 Party of Justice and Trust, Bosnia and Herzegovina
 Singapore People's Party, Singapore
 Swaziland Progressive Party, Eswatini
 Swedish People's Party of Finland, Finland

Other organizations 
 Southwest Power Pool, an American power-grid non-profit
 Stowarzyszenie Pisarzy Polskich, a Polish cultural institute for writers

Policies, protocols, processes, and programs
 Screening Partnership Program, a programwhere airports in the United States can use private screening agencies instead of the TSA
 Share Purchase Plan, a means of buying shares in a company 
 Specific physical preparedness, the status of being prepared for the movements in a specific activity
 State Partnership Program, protocol used by the National Guard of the United States
 Street Performer Protocol, a way of encouraging the creation of creative works in the public domain

Science and technology

Computing and networking
 Sequenced Packet Protocol, a network transport-layer protocol promulgated by Xerox
 Serial Port Profile, a Bluetooth wireless-interface profile
 Software Protection Platform, a Microsoft Windows license-validation module

Physics
 Self-propelled particles, a concept used in statistical physics to describe swarm behaviour
 Spiral Phase Plate, regarding angular momentum and light
 Surface plasmon polariton, a type of polariton from strong coupling of plasmons to electromagnetic waves

Other uses in science and technology
 Science Power Platform, a planned Russian module of the International Space Station
 spp. (from ), in biological taxonomy

Other uses
 Steyr SPP, a model of pistol
 Sam Powell-Pepper, an Australian-rules football player

See also
 SPP1 (disambiguation)